Evergreen is either of two localities:
Evergreen, Autauga County, Alabama, an unincorporated community also known as Huckabee
Evergreen, Conecuh County, Alabama, a city in southern Alabama